Follistatin-related protein can refer to:
 FSTL1
 FSTL3